Marie-Anne de Bovet (12 February 1855 - ?) was a French writer. From 1893 to 1930, she published 35 novels, in addition to other works. Her last work was written in 1935 when was 80 years old.

Biography
Marie-Anne de Bovet was born in Metz, France. She was the daughter of General Bovet. She married the Marquis de Bois-Hébert but she wrote under her maiden name. 

Her writing career began in 1889 by publishing travelogues. Her work appeared in several magazines and newspapers in French and English. She was bilingual. As early as 1888, Bovet frequented the salon of Juliette Adam. She wrote literary criticism in La Nouvelle Revue, and traveled to Ireland on behalf of La République Française, a Gambetta newspaper. She wrote for La Vie Parisienne and the feminist newspaper, La Fronde, founded in 1887 by Marguerite Durand. Here, her articles included "Housewife or Harlot" (9 December 1897), where she attacked Maupassant and Proudhon's speeches on women, and "The Eternal Feminine" (22 December 1897), where she rejected the categorization of women. Bovet protested against misogynist prejudice and defended women's intelligence. During the Dreyfus Affair, she wrote for La Libre Parole, a strongly anti-Semitic newspaper. Though she traveled widely, she wrote mainly on Ireland (three books) and Algeria; she also visited Scotland, Greece and Poland. The date and circumstances of her death are unknown, but her last work was written in 1935 when was 80 years old.

Awards 
During her lifetime, she was selected for the Louise Bourbonnaud Prize, which was a cash award established in Paris by Bourbonnaud to be given annually to a French explorer.

Selected works

Travelogues

 Lettres d’Irlande, Paris, Guillaumin et Cie, 1889
 Trois mois en Irlande, article illustré extrait du Tour du Monde, Hachette, 1891
 La Jeune Grèce, Société française d’édition d’art L.-H. May, 1897 - Prix Kastner-Boursault de l'Académie française. 
 L’Écosse. Souvenirs et impressions de voyage, Hachette, 1898
 Cracovie, H. Laurens, Paris, 1910
 L’Algérie, E. de Boccard, Paris, 1920 - Prix Montyon de l'Académie française.
 Alger-Djelfa, Laghouat-Ghardaïa et l’Heptapole de M’Zab, Imprimerie Algérienne, 1924
 De Paris aux dunes du Souf et retour en vingt-et-un jours, Georges Lacan, 1924
 Monographie du tapis algérien'''', édité par le Gouvernement général de l’Algérie, 1930
 Le désert apprivoisé, Randonnées au Sahara', Nouvelles Éditions Argo, Paris, 1933 - Prix Montyon de l'Académie française.
 La Grande Pitié du Sahara, Plon, 1935
 Notice sur les tapis algériens et autres industries indigènes, Imprimerie E. Pfister, ?

Novels

 Terre d’Emeraude, Ollendorff, 1893
 Confessions d’une fille de trente ans, Lemerre, 1895
 Roman de femmes, Lemerre, 1896
 Confessions conjugales, Lemerre, 1896
 Partie du pied gauche, Lemerre, 1897
 Parole jurée, Lemerre, 1897
 Par orgueil, Lemerre, 1898
 Petites rosseries, Lemerre, 1898
 Pris sur le vif, Lemerre, 1899
 Marionnettes, Lemerre, 1899
 Courte folie, Lemerre, 1901
 Monsieur Victor, roman publié par Le Monde Moderne, Albert Quantin, Paris, 1901
 Maîtresse royale, Lemerre, 1901
 La Cadette, Armand Colin, 1901
 La Belle Sabine, Lemerre, 1902
 Ballons rouges, Lemerre, 1903
 Autour de l’étendard, Lemerre, 1904 
 Ame d’Argile, Lemerre, 1904
 Contre l’impossible, Lemerre, 1905
 Plus fort que la Vie, Lemerre, 1905
 Noces blanches, Lemerre, 1906
 Le Beau Fernand, Hachette, 1906 - Prix Montyon de l'Académie française.
 La repentie, Lemerre, 1907
 Et l’Amour triomphe, Nilsson, 1907
 Après le Divorce, Lemerre, 1908
 La jolie Princesse, Lemerre, 1908
 La folle Passion, Lemerre, 1909
 La Dame à l’oreille de velours, Lemerre, 1911
 La Terre refleurira, Lemerre, 1913
 Le Fils de l’autre, Lemerre, 1914
 La Dernière de sa Race, Lemerre, 1924
 La Dame d’Antibes, Lemerre, 1927
 Veuvage blanc, édition de la Mode nationale, 1930
 L’Homme rouge'''', Nilsson, date?
 Défends ta femme contre la tentation', Nilsson, date?

References

Sources
  Marie Anne de Bovet, petite notice biographique, sans nom d’auteur, date et éditeur, numéro de notice : 107502526 à la BNUS
  Han Ryner, Le Massacre des Amazones : études critiques sur deux cents bas-bleus contemporains : Mesdames Adam, Sarah Bernhardt, Marie-Anne de Bovet, Bradamante, Jeanne Chauvin, Alphonse Daudet…, Paris, Chamuel, 19--?, p. 300

1855 births
Year of death unknown
19th-century French novelists
20th-century French novelists
French journalists
Writers from Metz
20th-century French women writers
19th-century French women writers
Female travelers
Women travel writers